Translocation protein SEC62 is a protein that in humans is encoded by the SEC62 gene.

Function 

The Sec61 complex is the central component of the protein translocation apparatus of the endoplasmic reticulum (ER) membrane. The protein encoded by this gene and SEC63 protein are found to be associated with ribosome-free SEC61 complex. It is speculated that Sec61-Sec62-Sec63 may perform post-translational protein translocation into the ER. The Sec61-Sec62-Sec63 complex might also perform the backward transport of ER proteins that are subject to the ubiquitin-proteasome-dependent degradation pathway. The encoded protein is an integral membrane protein located in the rough ER.

References

Further reading